Csaba Tőri (born 12 November 1987) is a musical conductor, music teacher and founding member of the Moltopera Company. He is a winner of the Rezső Lantos-prize.

Career

Conducting 

Csaba Tőri earned a degree in 2011 at the Franz Liszt Academy of Music where he was a student of Péter Erdei. After graduation he participated the foundation of the Moltopera Company. He leads two choirs, conducts the Vox Insana Chamber Choir and the Medicantare Women's Choir and directs the Budapest Academic Choral Society. At his graduation he conducted Brahms's Ein Deutsches Requiem.

Moltopera 

He founded the Moltopera Company in 2011. Moltopera mostly performs with piano accompaniment. On 3 November 2012 he conducted the ensemble in the Palace of Arts in Moltopera's Magic Flute performance.

Teacher 

 
At 24 years old, he started teaching in one of the most prestigious high schools of Hungary the Budapesti Fazekas Mihály Gimnázium. The next year he started as a teacher in the Béla Bartók Music High School. He lectures frequently as part of Moltopera Matinée.

Awards 

 National Competition of Young Conductors - 1st prize (Rezső Lantos-prize) and two special prizes

Sources 

  Csaba Tőri's profile on the homepage of the Moltopera
 Csaba Tőri on Musicianswho

1987 births
Living people
Czech music educators
Place of birth missing (living people)
Franz Liszt Academy of Music alumni